Thomas William Jeffray Barron (16 February 1908 – 29 September 1966) was a New Zealand lawn bowls player who represented his country at two British Empire and Commonwealth Games, in 1958 and 1962.

Barron was born on 16 February 1908, the son of Thomas and Ethel Jane Barron. On 10 August 1932, he married Eileen Mary Keeble at St Paul's Church, Wellington.

At the 1958 British Empire and Commonwealth Games in Cardiff, Barron represented New Zealand in the men's fours, alongside Robin Andrew, Stanley Snedden, and Bill Hampton, finishing in 10th place. He placed sixth in the men's singles at the 1962 British Empire and Commonwealth Games in Perth.

In 1962, Barron won the New Zealand National Bowls Championships singles title, representing the Miramar club.

Barron died on 29 September 1966, and his ashes were buried at Karori Cemetery.

References

1908 births
1966 deaths
New Zealand male bowls players
Commonwealth Games competitors for New Zealand
Bowls players at the 1958 British Empire and Commonwealth Games
Bowls players at the 1962 British Empire and Commonwealth Games
Burials at Karori Cemetery
20th-century New Zealand people